The 1960–61 Honduran Amateur League was the 13th edition of the Honduran Amateur League.  The season ran from 14 February 1960 to 6 March 1961, however, it was declared null and abandoned due to an excessive delay to start the final phase of the season.

Regional champions

Known results

National championship round
Scheduled to be played in a double round-robin format between the regional champions.  Also known as the Pentagonal.  However, only one game was played due to the withdrawals of C.D. Honduras and C.D.S. Vida.  It is unclear the reason why the Honduran Sports Federation decided on 6 March 1961 to proclaim C.D. Olimpia as 1960–61 national champions

Results

Olimpia's lineup

References

Liga Amateur de Honduras seasons
Honduras
1960 in Honduran sport
1961 in Honduran sport